Georgette Tsinguirides (born 27 February 1928) is a ballet dancer, ballet mistress and choreologist. She was the assistant of John Cranko at the Stuttgart Ballet and became in 1966 the first choreologist in Germany. Still active in 2015 after 70 years with the Stuttgart Ballet, Tsinguirides has been teaching the works choreographed by Cranko and his successors to several generations of ballet companies internationally.

Career 

Born in Stuttgart, Tsinguirides began her ballet training at the ballet school of the Staatstheater Stuttgart. She continued her studies with Olga Preobrajenska at the Studio Wacker in Paris and at the Royal Ballet School in London. Tsinguirides was engaged at the Staatstheater Stuttgart in 1945 and was promoted to soloist in 1957 under ballet director Nicolas Beriozoff. In 1960 she performed in Der Pagodenprinz by John Cranko who later succeeded Beriozoff as director in 1961. She performed in The Lady and the Fool, and in Romeo und Julia.

Cranko sent her to study the Benesh Movement Notation in London, which she completed in 1966. The notation, which shows movements of head, shoulders, hips, knees and feet on five lines similar to music notation, is according to experts still the most precise representation of ballet even in the time of video, offering also the possibility of synchronization with the music. Tsinguirides became the first choreologist in Germany in 1966, and preserved all major ballets by Cranko, and later Kenneth MacMillan, and others. She has been teaching these works several generations of ballet companies internationally, working with 45 ballet groups.

Awards 
 1973 "Fellowship of Institute of Choreology" of the Benesh Institute of Choreology
 1980 John Cranko Prize
 1986 Order of Merit of the Federal Republic of Germany
 2002 Order of Merit of Baden-Württemberg
 2006 Honorary member of the Staatstheater Stuttgart
 2010 Deutscher Tanzpreis
 2010 Member of the Royal Academy of Dance

References

External links 
 Georgette Tsinguirides wird 75 tanznetz.de

German ballerinas
Recipients of the Order of Merit of Baden-Württemberg
Recipients of the Cross of the Order of Merit of the Federal Republic of Germany
1928 births
Living people
People from Stuttgart
People educated at the Royal Ballet School
German people of Greek descent